Merle Martin Rasmussen is an American game designer and writer known for creating the espionage role-playing game Top Secret.

Education
Merle Rasmussen graduated from high school in Underwood, Iowa in 1975 and began classes to become a civil engineer (later a pre-professional medicine major) at Iowa State University that same year.

Career
In his Iowa State dormitory in 1975, Rasmussen began to develop and playtest an espionage simulation with his friends, and the next year he wrote to TSR to see if the game could be published; he received a response letter from Mike Carr wishing to review the game, and by the next year the simulation had the working title of Top Secret, which was eventually accepted for publication in 1978. Allen Hammack is assigned to the project as an editor, and Hammack worked with Rasmussen on rules clarifications and editing, and the game saw print by the end of February 1980. He also continued to work on the graveyard shift as an orderly in a Council Bluffs hospital and as a production technician in the Media Production Department of an educational agency in Southwest Iowa. He was also the President of Game Room Productions, Ltd., in Minden, Iowa since June 1979. Rasmussen's Top Secret (1980) was the sixth role-playing game published by TSR, and it was also the first espionage role-playing game ever published. Jackie and Merle Rasmussen wrote a two-part adventure, "Tortles of the Purple Sage", featured in Dungeon #6 (July/August 1987) and #7 (September/October 1987).

Rasmussen has also authored several other role-playing game related titles such as Ghost of Lion Castle, Midnight on Dagger Alley, Quagmire!, The Savage Coast and Top Secret Companion.

References

External links
Abebooks.com

American game designers
American male writers
Dungeons & Dragons game designers
Living people
Year of birth missing (living people)